"Love Like You and Me" is a song by English glam rock singer Gary Glitter, written by Glitter with Gerry Shephard and Mike Leander and produced by Mike Leander. It was released as a standalone single in the UK in 1975, and peaked at No. 10 on the UK Singles Chart.

Track listing
"Love Like You and Me" – 3:18
"I'll Carry Your Picture (Everywhere)" – 3:06

Chart performance

References

External links
 

1975 songs
1975 singles
Gary Glitter songs
Songs written by Mike Leander
Songs written by Gary Glitter
Song recordings produced by Mike Leander